The Grand Prix of Portland is an Indy Car Series race held at Portland International Raceway in Portland, Oregon. The race was held every year from 1984 through 2007 first as a CART series race, then as part of Champ Car World Series. After a ten-year absence, the race returned to the IndyCar Series for the 2018 season.

Portland is best-remembered as being the site of two of the closest finishes on a road course in Indy car racing history. In 1986, Michael Andretti lost fuel pressure on the final turn of the final lap, which allowed his father Mario to catch up and beat him to the finish line by 0.070 seconds. At the time, it was the closest finish of any race in Indy car history. In 1997, in a three-wide finish, Mark Blundell beat second place Gil de Ferran by 0.027 seconds, and beat third place Raul Boesel by 0.055 seconds. For a road course race, it was the all-time closest finish in CART series history, as well as the closest three-car finish in series history.

For nearly its entire existence, the title sponsor of the race was G.I. Joe's sporting goods and auto parts store, and the event was held during or around the Portland Rose Festival. Numerous times, the race was held on Father's Day. Beginning in 2018, the race was held in September on Labor Day weekend, promoted by Green Savoree Racing Promotions.

Race winners

IndyCar Series

Notes
1997 & 2001: Race shortened due to time limit.

Support races

Race summaries

CART PPG Indy Car World Series

1984: The CART series debuted at Portland International Raceway in 1984. It was also the first race which CART utilized radial tires. Mario Andretti and Danny Sullivan swept the front row in Lola T-800 machines, the only two Lola chassis in the field. Andretti, however, dropped out early with engine problems, and Sullivan suffered gear box trouble. Al Unser Jr. took the lead for the final time on lap 39, and led all the way to the finish for his first-career Indy car victory. Geoff Brabham finished second.
1985: Mario Andretti passed Al Unser Jr. for the lead with 19 laps to go, and pulled out to a 25-second victory. Unser Jr. led 49 laps, but after his final pit stop, a bad set of tires and fuel concerns forced him to slow his pace. Andretti was trailing by nearly 15 seconds, but a fast final pit stop, and handling adjustments allowed him to quickly close the gap and drive to victory. It was his second win in a row, and his third victory of the 1985 season. Indy 500 winner Danny Sullivan started on the pole position, but dropped out on lap 6 due to steering failure.
1986: In one of the most dramatic finishes in CART history, Mario Andretti beat his son Michael Andretti to the finish line by 0.07 seconds. It was the closest finish in Indy car racing history at the time. With ten laps to go, Michael led Mario by over eight seconds, and looked to be on his way to a dominating victory. Al Unser Jr. was in third position right on the back bumper of Mario. In the closing laps, however, Michael began experiencing fuel pickup problems. Mario and Unser Jr. were charging, and began trimming the lead. At the white flag, Michael still led by three seconds, but his engine was sputtering. As the cars came off the final corner, Michael's engine quit and he began to coast down the inside of the frontstretch. Mario and Unser Jr. raced to the finish line, and Mario nipped Michael at the line by about two feet. Unser came home a close third. In victory lane, a dejected Michael Andretti declared the win a Father's Day gift for Mario.
1987: Roberto Guerrero started on the pole position, but Emerson Fittipaldi got the jump at the start and took the lead on the first lap. Fittipaldi led 45 of the first 46 laps until a blown engine ended his day. Guerrero also dropped out early with engine failure. Bobby Rahal took the lead, and led 56 of the final 58 laps to score his first victory of the 1987 season. Rahal built up a lead of over 23 seconds, and lapped all but second place Michael Andretti. Rahal backed off the pace in the closing laps to conserve fuel, and held off Andretti by 6.39 seconds.
1988: Danny Sullivan started the race on the pole position, and led the first 13 laps. But as Sullivan was making his way through traffic on lap 14, he nearly clipped wheels with Rocky Moran and did a half spin to the infield grass. Arie Luyendyk slipped by to take the lead, and Al Unser Jr. took over second. Sullivan dropped to third, but the car was undamaged. Luyendyk led 53 laps and appeared poised to win his first Indy car race. With Luyendyk, Unser, and Sullivan running 1st-2nd-3rd, the leaders prepared for their final pit stop. Luyendyk pitted on lap 69, and Unser pitted on lap 70. Unser's pit stop lasted 32 seconds due to a problem with the left rear wheel, and he dropped out of contention. Sullivan pitted on lap 71. The Penske Team's lighting-fast pit stop put Sullivan out ahead of Luyendyk, and Sullivan drove to victory. Luyendyk finished second, his best career finish at the time, but his pace was slowed at the end after he lost third gear.
1989: Teo Fabi scored the first pole position for the Porsche Indy Car team, and led 17 laps, en route to a fourth-place finish. Emerson Fittipaldi won the race, crossing the finish line just seconds before his car ran out of fuel. Bobby Rahal finished second, and gave Fittipaldi a ride back to the pits on his sidepod. Minor mishaps made for a wild afternoon, including the asphalt pavement breaking up in the chicane, and a water main break that threatened to flood some of the pit stalls. Scott Pruett tangled with Al Unser Jr. in the chicane on lap 65, sending Unser into the tire barrier with a broken rear wing. Later, Pruett spun out on his own, right in front of Unser, prompting Unser to clap in celebration. Geoff Brabham was driving in substitute for Danny Sullivan who was still recovering from a broken arm at Indianapolis. Brabham was running second with 14 laps to go when radiator problems put him out.

1990: Michael and Mario Andretti, now teammates at Newman Haas Racing, finished 1st-2nd for the second time in an Indy car race. It was the second time it occurred at Portland (after 1986), though this time Michael finished on top. Michael Andretti took the lead at the start, and led 101 of 104 laps.
1991: Michael Andretti made a daring pass at the start of the race, and grabbed the lead from the fourth starting position. Andretti would go on to lead all but two laps, and won at Portland for the second consecutive year. As the field came down the frontstretch to take the green flag, Michael Andretti darted to the middle to pass Scott Pruett, then the field fanned out five-wide. Andretti narrowly squeezed between Rick Mears and pole-sitter Emerson Fittipaldi and emerged with the lead in the chicane. Emerson Fittipaldi finished second. Andretti's only tense moment of the day came around the halfway point. He became mired behind the lapped car of Truesports driver Scott Pruett, which allowed Fittipaldi to close within a few seconds. Pruett, who qualified third and finished eight, had a decent run in the Truesports 91C chassis, holding off Andretti for many laps, but was noticeably down on power with the Judd AV engine.
1992: For the third year in a row, Michael Andretti won in dominating fashion. Andretti took the lead at the start and led 100 of 102 laps. It was Andretti's first win of the 1992 season, and the first Indy car victory for the new Ford Cosworth XB engine. The 1992 race saw changes to the race track. The chicane near the end of the mainstretch was removed, and replaced by the sharper and longer Festival Curves.
1993: Nigel Mansell started from the pole, and led the first 27 laps. In fierce battle with Emerson Fittipaldi, Mansell locked up the brakes on lap 28 going into the Festival Curves, and slid off-course into a row of cones and into the runoff area. Mansell kept the engine running, and re-joined the race, but Fittipaldi was now the leader. The skies opened up on lap 45, soaking the course, and forced the teams to switch to rain tires for the next 25-30 laps. Fittipaldi led 70 of the final 75 laps, and won for the second time at Portland. Mansell charged back to finish in second place.
1994: Team Penske swept the podium with Al Unser Jr. winning, Emerson Fittipaldi second, and Paul Tracy third. Unser grabbed the lead at the start and led 96 laps en route to victory. Unser made his final pit stop on lap 69. Fittipaldi made his stop one lap later, and for a moment appeared that he would emerge as the leader. Unser on warmer tires, passed Fittipaldi coming out of the Festival Curves, and led the rest of the way.
1995: Al Unser Jr. dominated the race, leading 76 of the 102 laps, and beat second place Jimmy Vasser by over 28 seconds. However, Unser's car failed post-race inspection due to insufficient ground clearance. Unser was stripped of the victory, and Jimmy Vasser was elevated to the winner, tentatively his first-career Indy car triumph. Throughout the race, Unser's machine was observed bottoming out, and on lap 90, a portion of the plywood skidpad flew off the bottom of the car. Vasser was informed of the decision three hours after the race. Team Penske protested the ruling, claiming that the skidpad damage was caused by a bumpy track surface. The appeals process dragged out through the summer, and in August, CART officials formally denied the appeal. The case was then sent to a three-member panel for a second appeal. The panel ruled that the CART technicians used inconsistent methods to measure Unser's car versus the other cars in the field. The panel re-instated the victory, and 21 championship points, to Unser on September 22. Vasser was moved back to second place. The ruling did not change the championship standings, however, as Unser would finish second in the final points standings with or without the victory.
1996: Rookie Alex Zanardi won his first CART series race, leading 88 of the 102 laps. About 30 laps into the race, a rain shower swept over the track, but Zanardi elected not to switch to rain tires. His 17-second lead evaporated, and Al Unser Jr. passed Zanardi for the lead on lap 39. The lead was short-lived, as Unser's rain tires began to fall off. Two laps later, Zanardi was back in the lead, and the rain soon stopped. Zanardi pulled away for a 9-second win over Gil de Ferran.

CART Fedex Championship Series

1997: The race was the closest finish in the history of the CART series on a road course, as well as the closest three-car finish of any Indy car race at the time. Rain fell most of the day, making for a slick track, resulting in several spins and numerous off-course excursions. Late in the race, Gil de Ferran led with Christian Fittipaldi close behind in second, but the race was approaching the two-hour time limit. With the track slowly starting to dry, some teams elected gamble and change to slick tires. Paul Tracy, Maurício Gugelmin, Alex Zanardi, and others all came out on slicks and proceeded to spin off course. On lap 68 Mark Blundell also switched to slicks, and he too attempted to chase down the leaders. The race was set to end early at the completion of lap 78. With two laps to go, Blundell had caught up to de Ferran and Fittipaldi, but was carefully trying to maneuver around traffic and stay on course. Blundell passed Fittipaldi for second in turn ten. Meanwhile, Raul Boesel was closing in on the leaders as well. The white flag was raised by Gil de Ferran as Mark Blundell pursued him. On the last lap, de Ferran struggled mightily to keep Blundell at bay as they were nose-to-tail and side by side. Boesel slipped by Fittipaldi for third place in turn nine, and quickly closed in behind the two leaders. Coming off the final turn of the final lap, the finish became a three-wide drag race between de Ferran, Blundell, and Boesel. Mark Blundell nosed ahead at the finish line and beat Gil de Ferran by 0.027 seconds. Boesel crossed the finish line third, only 0.055 seconds behind. it was Blundell's first CART series victory, and first professional win since the 1992 24 Hours of Le Mans.
1998: At the start, Greg Moore's car veered to the inside, then wildly hopped the curbing going into the Festival Curves. Moore crashed out himself along with Paul Tracy and Christian Fittipaldi. At least four other cars were involved, including Michael Andretti who was hit and stalled in the gravel trap. Polesitter Bryan Herta led the first 13 laps, but his Team Rahal crew decided to pit during a caution on lap 14 and make it a three-stop race. The pit strategy backfired, however, and Herta spent most of the day trying to catch back up to the lead. Alex Zanardi, utilizing a two-stop strategy, was leading the race when Dario Franchitti had a frightening crash on lap 73. Franchitti clipped wheels with P. J. Jones, and slammed into the outside barrier near turn ten. Herta immediately ducked into the pits during the resulting caution, and bunched up behind Zanardi for the subsequent restart. Zanardi got the jump on the restart, while Herta was held up behind the lapped car Richie Hearn. Gil de Ferran pounced on Herta, but the two cars tangled in the Festival Curves. Scott Pruett slipped by to take second, while Zanardi went on to win. Herta recovered to finish third.
1999: With most teams employing a two-stop, fuel conservation strategy, Gil de Ferran of Walker Racing decided to scuttle the fuel conservation and drive all-out for the lead. He would need three pit stops, and would have to hope for no full-course caution periods during his final stint. With less than ten laps to go, de Ferran had built up a 29-second lead over second place Juan Pablo Montoya, but needed one final pit stop for fuel. On lap 90, de Ferran came in for a splash-and-go stop for fuel, and remarkably came out on the track still seven seconds ahead of Montoya. Gil de Ferran held on over the final 8 laps and scored his first CART series victory in three years, and the first win for Walker Racing since Robby Gordon at Detroit in 1995.
2000: In an effort to take fuel strategy off the table, the race was lengthened from 98 to 112 laps. One driver, however, Roberto Moreno, still attempted to finish the race with only two pit stops. Gil de Ferran, now with Penske Racing, mimicked his strategy from the previous year, and raced all-out, all along planning three pit stops. In the closing laps, the leaders started cycling through a series of splash-and-go pit stops. Gil de Ferran pitted on lap 89, while race leader Hélio Castroneves pitted on lap 105. The lead went to Gil de Ferran, while Moreno stayed out and moved up to second. The victory went to de Ferran, his second consecutive win at Portland. After leading 85 laps, Castroneves ran out of fuel on the final lap and finished a distant 7th place.
2001: Steady rain made for a slippery course, resulting in several spins and crashes, and nine caution periods. The race was shortened from 98 to 76 laps due to the two-hour time limit, and Max Papis emerged as the winner. Papis started on the pole position and avoided all the melees, and made only one pit stop en route to victory. Papis held off Roberto Moreno, who finished second at Portland for the second year in a row.
2002: Cristiano da Matta started from the pole, but Kenny Bräck grabbed the lead at the start. Brack controversially caused the start to be waved off three times for not being properly in line. Then on the fourth start attempt, a collision deep in the field sent three cars spinning and three to the escape road. Brack led 55 of the first 59 laps. On lap 60, Brack, Cristiano da Matta, and Bruno Junqueira all came in the pits, running 1-2-3. Brack came out first, but while accelerating into the Festival Curves, lost the left rear wheel which was not properly fastened. Cristiano de Matta led the rest of the way, holding of Junquiera by 0.625 seconds for the victory.
2003: Adrián Fernández passed Paul Tracy going into the Festival Curves on lap 86, and drove to victory, the first CART series win by an owner/driver since 1992. The pass came one lap after a restart, and Tracy came home second. Tracy started on the pole position and led 42 laps, but he was penalized on lap 44 for a pit exit infraction. In a battle for the lead with Michel Jourdain Jr., Tracy cut off Jourdain in the pit lane, swinging out of his pit box directly to the outside fast lane, which was against the rules. One lap later, Jourdain and Tracy went side by side into the Festival Curves, and locked wheels, sending Jourdain spinning and out of contention.

Champ Car World Series

2004: Sébastien Bourdais started on the pole position and won the race, his first victory at Portland. Bourdais led 85 of the 94 laps, on a hot, slick day. Bruno Junqueira, who started second, was charging near the end on the alternate "red" tires. Bourdais at one point held an 8.8-second advantage, but Junqueira closed the gap. With two laps to go, Junqueira set the fastest lap of the race, but Bourdais held on at the finish line to win by 1.247 seconds.
2005: Justin Wilson started on the pole and led 43 of the first 45 laps. But Wilson dropped out with an oil pump failure on lap 46. Cristiano da Matta drove to victory, his second win at Portland.
2006: One week after being fired at RuSPORT, A. J. Allmendinger switched to the Forsythe team, and subsequently drove to victory at Portland, his first win in Champ Car. It was the first of three consecutive wins on the 2006 Champ Car season, and five overall with the team. Allmendinger led 100 of the 105 laps, and beat his former RuSPORT teammate Justin Wilson by 5.420 seconds.
2007: The final Champ Car race at Portland was the milestone 100th victory for Newman/Haas Racing. Sébastien Bourdais took the lead on lap 57, and cruised to victory. It was the first and only time the Champ Car race at Portland began with a standing start. The race went without a caution, and Bourdais beat second place Justin Wilson by 13.537 seconds.

IndyCar Series
2018: After a ten-year absence, Portland returns to the Indy car calendar. Will Power won the pole for the return race, breaking Justin Wilson's track record from 2005. On the first corner, Zach Veach gave James Hinchcliffe no room and spun him out into traffic including drivers Ed Jones, Graham Rahal, Scott Dixon, and Marco Andretti who went up on the wheels of Hinchcliffe and went over him and Ed Jones and landing on his top. Scott Dixon stopped and hit nothing and continued on, amazingly he finished the race fifth. In the end after Alexander Rossi and Josef Newgarden dominated the race, an untimely caution came out and shuffled the field around. Max Chilton stayed out and led a few laps before pitting late, giving the lead to Takuma Sato, he led the final laps while conserving push to pass seconds and holding off Ryan Hunter-Reay who was charging at the end. It was Sato's first win on a permanent road course and first since his 2017 Indianapolis 500 win.
2019: Colton Herta started on pole but, the race was won by Will Power with Felix Rosenqvist finishing second and Alexander Rossi third. The 1st corner of the 1st lap also ended up taking out both SPM cars, and Zach Veach after Graham Rahal tried a move that was too late going on the inside. Graham was also taken out as well.
2020: On July 27, 2020, IndyCar officials were forced to cancel the 2020 edition of the race due to the state of Oregon's ban on gatherings of more than 100 people because of the COVID-19 pandemic.
2021: IndyCar returned to Portland in 2021 under the leadership of Roger Penske. Alex Palou took his first pole position of the season and despite getting cycled back after an early first turn pile up managed to win the race to retake the championship points lead. Alexander Rossi earned his first podium of the season with a second-place finish while Scott Dixon would finish third.
2022: Scott McLaughlin qualified on pole. To prevent a first lap first corner pileup the drivers agreed to get the green flag further back on the front straight than previous years. This early start was successful in preventing a first lap pileup, and the race went 97 laps without a yellow. McLaughlin led 104 of 110 laps and won the race from pole. Will Power and Scott Dixon rounded out the podium.

References

External links
Official Site

 
Recurring sporting events established in 1984
Recurring sporting events disestablished in 2007
Recurring sporting events established in 2018
1984 establishments in Oregon
Sports in Portland, Oregon
Annual events in Portland, Oregon